Black Mountain is a large hill which overlooks the city of Belfast, Northern Ireland.

Background 
With a height of 1,275 ft (389 m), Black Mountain towers over most of west Belfast and is part of the Belfast Hills. Its name is probably derived from the adjoining mountain called Divis, and they may have been seen as one mountain in the past. On the summit is Black Mountain transmitting station.

Geology 
Black Mountain is composed of basalt with limestone underneath, as is Cavehill further north. There have been flint finds in the area, which also contains raths, deserted farms and overgrown paths joining the fields and homesteads and trails scattered over the mountain. On a clear day there are views of Lough Neagh, Strangford Lough, the Mournes and the Sperrins, as well as Scotland and County Donegal.

For many years people have lobbied for the preservation of the Belfast Hills, hoping to bring an end to many years of quarrying. The quarry is steep and deeply excavated and the basalt from it is used mostly for road stone. The hill is under National Trust guardianship.

Awards
Amazing Spaces award (8 November 2005)

References

External links
Virtual tour of Black Mountain - Virtual Visit Northern Ireland

Mountains and hills of County Antrim
Volcanism of Northern Ireland
Geography of Belfast
Surface mines in Northern Ireland